Autonomous okrugs (avtonomnyy okrug; more correctly referred to as "autonomous districts" or "autonomous areas") are a type of federal subject of the Russian Federation and simultaneously an administrative division type of some federal subjects. As of 2014, Russia has four autonomous okrugs of its 85 federal subjects. The Chukotka Autonomous Okrug is the only okrug which is not subordinate to an oblast. The other three are Arkhangelsk Oblast's Nenets Autonomous Okrug, and Tyumen Oblast's Yamalo-Nenets Autonomous Okrug and Khanty-Mansi Autonomous Okrug.

According to the constitution of the USSR, autonomous republics, autonomous oblasts and autonomous okrugs had the right, by means of a referendum, to independently resolve the issue of staying in the USSR or in the seceding union republic, as well as to raise the issue of their state-legal status.

History
Originally called national okrug, this type of administrative unit was created in the 1920s and widely implemented in 1930s to provide autonomy to indigenous peoples of the North, like the Karelian National Okrug  for the Tver Karelians. In 1977, the 1977 Soviet Constitution changed the term "national okrugs" to "autonomous okrugs" in order to emphasize that they were indeed autonomies and not simply another type of administrative and territorial division. While the 1977 Constitution stipulated that the autonomous okrugs are subordinated to the oblasts and krais, this clause was revised on December 15, 1990, when it was specified that autonomous okrugs are subordinated directly to the Russian SFSR, although they still may stay in jurisdiction of a krai or an oblast to which they were subordinated before.

Autonomous Okrugs

Former Autonomous Okrugs

Recent developments
In 1990, ten autonomous okrugs existed within the RSFSR. Between 2005 and 2008, the three autonomous okrugs in which the titular nationality constituted more than 30% of the population were abolished. Since then, three more have been abolished, leaving four. On 13 May 2020, the governors of Arkhangelsk Oblast and Nenets Autonomous Okrug announced their plan to merge following the collapse of oil prices stemming from the COVID-19 pandemic. The process was subsequently scrapped on July 2 following public outcry to the merger.

The ten autonomous okrugs in 1990 were:

Ethnic composition of autonomous okrugs
The table below also includes autonomous okrugs which have since changed status.

References

See also
Autonomous republics of the Soviet Union
Autonomous oblasts of the Soviet Union
Federal subjects of Russia
Republics of Russia

 
Subdivisions of the Soviet Union
 
Soviet Union
Russian-speaking countries and territories
Federal subjects of Russia